Denise Anne Lievesley  is a British social statistician.  She has formerly been Chief Executive of the English Information Centre for Health and Social Care, Director of Statistics at UNESCO, in which capacity she founded the UNESCO Institute for Statistics, and Director (1991–1997) of what is now the UK Data Archive (known as the ESRC Data Archive and as the Data Archive during her tenure).

While Director of the Data Archive, Lievesley held the position of Professor of Research Methods at the University of Essex. She has served as a United Nations Special Adviser on Statistics, stationed in Addis Ababa.

She served as president of the Royal Statistical Society from 1999 to 2001, and has been President of the International Statistical Institute (2007–2009) and the International Association for Official Statistics (1995–1997). She was appointed Commander of the Order of the British Empire (CBE) in the 2014 Birthday Honours for services to social science.

From 2015 to 2020 she was Principal of Green Templeton College, Oxford.

She is an Honorary Fellow of St Edmund's College, Cambridge.

References

British statisticians
Living people
Academics of the University of Essex
Academics of King's College London
Presidents of the International Statistical Institute
Presidents of the Royal Statistical Society
Place of birth missing (living people)
Year of birth missing (living people)
Commanders of the Order of the British Empire
Fellows of the Academy of Social Sciences
Fellows of the American Statistical Association
Women statisticians
Principals of Green Templeton College, Oxford
Women academic administrators